Treuen is a town in the Vogtlandkreis district, in Saxony, Germany. It is situated 13 km east of Plauen, and 7 km northwest of Auerbach (Vogtland).

References 

Towns in Saxony
Vogtlandkreis